Paços de Ferreira is a city in the Porto District, in the north of Portugal. The population of the city in 2011 was 7491, while its municipality had 56,340 inhabitants, in an area of 70.99 km².

Sometimes referred to as the Capital do Móvel (capital of furniture), owing to the predominance of this industry within its territory, the municipality has around 5000 companies producing furniture and has the biggest exhibition and selling area (estimated in 2.5 million square meters) of furniture in Europe. It is also the location of IKEA's industrial operations within Portugal.

Its football team, FC Paços de Ferreira, participated for three times in European Competitions (Champions League and Europa League), finished runners-up of the Portuguese cup in 2008/2009 and of the Portuguese League Cup in 2010/2011.

History 
The territory of the current municipality was occupied by humans since prehistory. In the parish of Sanfins de Ferreira, there is an important hillfort, the Citânia de Sanfins, that was one of the main settlements of the Celtic tribes who lived in northwest Iberian Peninsula (Gallaeci). 
In medieval times, this planaltic area had few population. The only centers of power were the monastery of Ferreira and the noble families concentrated in the parish of Frazão.

After the Portuguese Civil War, the new constitucional regime made important administrative changes, and, for the first time, granted administrative autonomy for the populations of the region, creating a municipality in 1836 and appointing the most central parish of the plateau, Santa Eulália de Paços de Ferreira, as capital.

Since then, the territory registered a remarkable development, and the population more than sextupled in 150 years.

In the beginnings of the 20th century, a local elementary school teacher, Albino de Matos, invented new tools and furniture which began to be used in schools all around the country, marking the beginning of the furniture industry in Paços de Ferreira. In the second half of the century, with the economic growth of the country, the carpenters of Paços de Ferreira started to make and sell furniture for houses, which allowed the industry to expand, becoming the most important activity of the population.

In 1993 the Portuguese parliament gave the title of city to Paços de Ferreira.

Geography

Administratively, the municipality is divided into 12 civil parishes (freguesias):

 Carvalhosa
 Eiriz
 Ferreira
 Figueiró
 Frazão Arreigada
 Freamunde [city]
 Meixomil
 Paços de Ferreira [city]
 Penamaior
 Raimonda
 Sanfins Lamoso Codessos
 Seroa

Climate
Paços de Ferreira has a warm-summer Mediterranean climate (Csb) with cool, very rainy winters and warm summers that are dry enough to avoid being classified as oceanic (Cfb).

Demographics

Sport
 F.C. Paços de Ferreira (Football)
 S.C. Freamunde

Notable people 
 Sílvia Cardoso (1882–1950) a beatified Portuguese Roman Catholic apostolate for the poor in Brazil, she also funded a boarding school for girls and supported a hospital

Sport 
 Carlos Pinto (born 1973) a Portuguese former footballer with 378 club caps
 Pedro Correia (born 1974), known as Pedro, a former football goalkeeper with 276 club caps
 Joaquim Agostinho da Silva Ribeiro (born 1975), known as Agostinho, a retired footballer with 379 club caps
 Carlos Carneiro (born 1975) a Portuguese former footballer with 367 club caps 
 Marisa Barros (born 1980), a Portuguese marathon runner, competed at the 2008 & 2012 Summer Olympics
 Ricardo Manuel Ferreira Sousa (born 1981), known as Cadú, a footballer with over 480 club caps
 André Leão (born 1985) a Portuguese professional footballer with over 360 club caps 
 Luís Pedro (born 1989), a Portuguese footballer with over 350 club caps

Gallery

References

 
Cities in Portugal
Municipalities of Porto District